Forever Yours is the seventh album by the Los Angeles, California-based R&B group the Sylvers. Originally recorded when the Sylvers were still signed to Capitol Records, big brother Leon took over on production. Capitol did not like the new sound and rejected the album and dropped them. The Sylvers shopped the material elsewhere and by mid-1978 had signed with Casablanca Records. This would be their most critically acclaimed album, it would also be the last album Leon would be involved with for the family until 1981's album Concept as he would leave to become in-house producer for Dick Griffey's SOLAR Records. Two singles were released. "Don't Stop, Get Off" charted in late 1978 at number 15 on the US R&B charts. "Forever Yours" was the second single released in 1979 and didn't chart at all due to management shake-ups at Casablanca, even though it was sent to both pop and R&B radio stations.

Track listing
"Don't Stop, Get Off" (Edmund Sylvers, Foster Sylvers, James Sylvers, Leon Sylvers III, Joseph Sylvers) – 3:08
"Love Changes" (Leon Sylvers III) – 2:43
"Forever Yours"  (Leon Sylvers III, Edmund Sylvers) – 3:48
"Swept for You Baby"  (Smokey Robinson) – 3:25
"Play This One Last Record"  (Leon Sylvers III, Edmund Sylvers, Patricia L. Sylvers) – 4:31
"Come Dance With Me"  (James Sylvers) – 3:12
"Come On Down to My House" (James Sylvers, Leon Sylvers III) –
"Diamonds Are Rare"  (Leon Sylvers III) – 2:56
"Love Wont Let Me Go" (Leon Sylvers III, Z. Perry) – 3:43
"Just a Little Bit Longer"  (Leon Sylvers III, Gene Dozier) – 3:02

Personnel
The Sylvers – backing vocals
Foster Sylvers, James Sylvers – bass
Edward Greene, John P. Guerin, Stephen Gadd – drums
Herman Brown, Jay Graydon, Mitchell L. Holder, Ricky Sylvers, Robben L. Ford, Tim May – guitar
H. Grusin, James Sylvers, Patricia Sylvers, Richard Tee, Reginald Burke, Sylvester L. Rivers, Jr. – keyboards
Gary L. Coleman, Victor S. Feldman – percussion
Don Menza, Ernest J. Watts, James R. Horn, Peter Christlieb, Terry Harrington – reeds
Michael J. Boddicker – synthesizer
Charles B. Findley, Dick Hyde – trombone
Charles B. Findley, Gene A. Goe, Oliver Mitchell, Oscar Brashear – trumpet
James R. Horn, Dennis Quitman, Thomas Scott – woodwind

Charts

Singles

References

External links
 Forever Yours at Discogs

1978 albums
The Sylvers albums
Casablanca Records albums
Albums produced by Leon Sylvers III